Rogério Tolomei Teixeira (born September 2, 1956), better known by his stage name Rogério Skylab, is a Brazilian singer-songwriter, lyricist, classical guitarist, poet, essayist, record producer, actor and former television presenter. Describing himself as a "corpse within MPB", his unique musical style is characterized by minimalism and eclecticism, and his lyrics are permeated by acerbic allusions to popular culture, pessimism, scatology, nihilism and black comedy (he has, however, always denied that his songs have humorous purposes). Some of his most recognizable compositions are "Matador de Passarinho" (which brought him into nationwide fame in the underground scene), "Motosserra", "Dedo, Língua, Cu e Boceta", "Eu Chupo o Meu Pau", "Fátima Bernardes Experiência" and "Chico Xavier & Roberto Carlos" (the latter two being notable for having been censored from their original releases).

Biography
Rogério Skylab was born Rogério Tolomei Teixeira in Rio de Janeiro, Brazil, on September 2, 1956, and is of Italian and Portuguese descent. He has degrees in literature and philosophy from the Federal University of Rio de Janeiro, and also began attending a law course, but never finished it.

Prior to his musical career, Skylab worked for 28 years as a public servant at a Banco do Brasil agency in Maracaju, Mato Grosso do Sul. After a brief stint as the vocalist of punk rock band Setembro Negro in the mid- to late 1980s, in 1991 he participated as a solo artist in a music festival in Juiz de Fora, Minas Gerais; he won the first-place cash prize with the song "Samba do Skylab", from which he took his stage name, explaining that he considered himself "akin to a space station, picking up different transmissions here and there and fashioning them into a single whole". Rogério used the prize money to finance the recording of his debut album, Fora da Grei, which was released the following year; it was very well-received by the critics, and awarded him many appearances on Jô Soares' late-night talk shows Jô Soares Onze e Meia and Programa do Jô throughout the 1990s and 2000s.

In 1999 he released his second album, the first one in a series of ten self-titled albums, Skylab. It was produced by Robertinho do Recife and spawned which is arguably his most well known song, "Matador de Passarinho", but Skylab was slightly unsatisfied with the final result, saying that it had "too much keyboards" and that he was not too creatively involved with it. His third album, Skylab II, was his first live release; commenting about it, he has stated that "this is 100% Skylab. The other was 80% Robertinho". Skylab II counted with a guest appearance by Löis Lancaster, vocalist of avant-garde group Zumbi do Mato – Lancaster would return for Skylab's second live album, Skylab IX, which also had guest appearances by Maurício Pereira (of Os Mulheres Negras) and Marcelo Birck (of Graforreia Xilarmônica). Zé Felipe and Marlos Salustiano, respectively bassist and keyboardist for Zumbi do Mato, collaborated with Skylab on his 2007 album Skylab VII, which was nominated to the Prêmio Dynamite de Música Independente in the "Best Rock Album" category; two years later, Felipe and Skylab made a collaborative album, Rogério Skylab & Orquestra Zé Felipe. In 2005, Skylab won the Prêmio Claro de Música Independente, in the "Best MPB Album" category, for Skylab V.

After the release of Skylab X, Skylab put aside his experimental sound to work on the "Trilogia dos Carnavais" ("Trilogy of the Carnivals"), which focuses more on traditional Brazilian genres such as samba, bossa nova and MPB. The trilogy comprises the albums Abismo e Carnaval, Melancolia e Carnaval and Desterro e Carnaval, and included the guest appearances of many musicians, such as Jorge Mautner, Jards Macalé, Arrigo Barnabé, Fausto Fawcett and Michael Sullivan. Between 2016 and 2018 he collaborated with Lívio Tragtenberg on a further trilogy of albums aptly titled Skylab & Tragtenberg.

On November 15, 2017, he released the self-titled Skylab EP, which counted with guest appearances by São Paulo-based experimental/noise rock duo Farme&Hixizine and carioca electronica musician Cadu Tenório. Of its three tracks, only one ("Bocetinha de Cocô", a teaser for the then-unreleased final volume of the Skylab & Tragtenberg trilogy initially uploaded separately to YouTube as a single on November 5) was written by Skylab; the other two ("Let's Play That" and "Pra Dizer Adeus") are poems by Torquato Neto set to music by other artists, namely Jards Macalé and Edu Lobo, respectively.

On March 7, 2018, Skylab officially announced that he began work on a new studio album, entitled O Rei do Cu, released later that year on May 17. On a Facebook post he further elaborated that O Rei do Cu would be the first installment of a new trilogy, the "Trilogia do Cu" ("Trilogy of the Ass"); the second installment, Nas Portas do Cu, came out on January 1, 2019, and the third, Crítica da Faculdade do Cu, on December 20, 2019.

On March 19, 2020, he uploaded to his official YouTube channel the single "À Sombra de um Horizonte" as a teaser for his album Cosmos, the first installment of a new trilogy entitled the "Trilogia do Cosmos". It was announced on his Facebook page on August 19 and released on October 2. The second installment, Os Cosmonautas, came out on December 24, 2020. On July 25, 2021, he uploaded to YouTube the single "Cantos de Maldoror", a teaser for the final installment of the trilogy entitled Caos e Cosmos (itself a "trilogy within a trilogy", meant to be counted as a single release). A second single, "As Coisas que Ficaram por Dizer", was uploaded on August 16. A third single, "Será que Tem?", was uploaded on September 1. The first volume of Caos e Cosmos was ultimately released on October 1, 2021. Volume 2 came out on August 5, 2022, preceded by the single "A Gente Vai Ficar Surdo" on July 15. The third and final volume is currently slated for a mid-2023 release, following the single "Rua Barão de Mesquita", uploaded on February 3.

On December 10, 2022, Skylab uploaded to YouTube the single "Juízo Final", a Nelson Cavaquinho cover, featuring , who played the guitar and contributed with the arrangements.

On February 6, 2022, he released Live, his first live album since 2016's Trilogia dos Carnavais: 25 Anos de Carreira ou de Lápide. It was recorded during a July 31, 2021 livestream he uploaded to his YouTube channel, celebrating the 30th anniversary of his musical career, and each track of it was taken from one of his respective albums, ranging from his debut Fora da Grei to his most recent release at the time, Os Cosmonautas. The recording of "Vampiro" was released as a teaser single on December 27, 2021.

In 2017 he debuted as an actor, portraying a history teacher on the Fabrício Bittar comedy film Como se Tornar o Pior Aluno da Escola, based on Danilo Gentili's eponymous book. He also runs and owns the blog "Godard City", where he posts original poems and essays about music and literature. In 2020 he published the collection of political essays Lulismo Selvagem through Kotter Editorial, who also re-issued Debaixo das Rodas de um Automóvel after many years out of print. His third book, a literary study on Henry James' œuvre (focusing on The Turn of the Screw) entitled A Outra Volta da Outra Volta, was released in 2022.

Personal life and controversies
Skylab has been married to photographer, record producer and plastic artist Solange Venturi since 1983; Venturi has designed the cover arts for many of the musician's albums since then. He is a self-described agnostic and has stated that "religion is a non-issue: it doesn't exist" in a 2003 web interview.

Known for his extensive and varied musical and literary influences, some of his favorite writers are Machado de Assis (whom he considers "his Bible and his God"), João Cabral de Melo Neto ("the greatest Brazilian poet of all time"), Clarice Lispector, Jorge Luis Borges, Milton Hatoum and Cristóvão Tezza. Musically, he cites Arrigo Barnabé, Os Mulheres Negras, Graforreia Xilarmônica, Zumbi do Mato, Frank Zappa, Jupiter Apple and Damião Experiença as influences; his 2002 album Skylab III was dedicated to Damião.

A life-long fan of Fluminense, he has even recorded the club's anthem on the 2016 collaboration album Skylab & Tragtenberg, Vol. 1.

Skylab has expressed admiration towards former Governor of Rio de Janeiro Leonel Brizola (dedicating to him the song "O Preto do Brizola" off his 2018 album O Rei do Cu) and three-time petista President Luiz Inácio Lula da Silva; in a 2019 interview for radio program Pânico, broadcast by Jovem Pan, he described himself as "linked to the left, [but] against political correctness". He was a frequent collaborator of the left-leaning news website  beginning in the late 2010s.

In mid-2018 Skylab was notoriously engaged in a feud with also Rio de Janeiro-based indie rock band Autoramas, towards which he displays a particular distaste; after posting on his Twitter page that he considered Autoramas "the worst band of all time", they replied disdainfully by saying "at least [they were] professional musicians, with shows all around the year and touring all around the world", finishing by calling Skylab an "amateur artist" and calling him out for supposedly having previously contacted their frontman Gabriel Thomaz to write songs for him. To this, Skylab then merely replied by calling Thomaz a "sick fuck" and telling him to "fuck off".

His controversial, unorthodox lyrical matter has resulted in three of his songs being censored in the early 2000s; claiming matters of "self-censorship", he himself removed "Câncer no Cu" and "Chico Xavier & Roberto Carlos" from his 2003 album Skylab IV, but both songs were eventually included as bonus tracks for free download on Skylab's official website. One year later, "Fátima Bernardes Experiência" was removed from Skylab V; however, it was re-introduced to the album's track listing in a subsequent 2005 re-release and re-issued as a single in 2023.

Discography

 Fora da Grei (1992)
 Skylab (1999)
 Skylab III (2002)
 Skylab IV (2003)
 Skylab V (2004)
 Skylab VI (2006)
 Skylab VII (2007)
 Skylab VIII (2008)
 Skylab X (2011)
 Abismo e Carnaval (2012)
 Melancolia e Carnaval (2014)
 Desterro e Carnaval (2015)
 O Rei do Cu (2018)
 Nas Portas do Cu (2019)
 Crítica da Faculdade do Cu (2019)
 Cosmos (2020)
 Os Cosmonautas (2020)
 Caos e Cosmos, Vol. 1 (2021)
 Caos e Cosmos, Vol. 2 (2022)
 Caos e Cosmos, Vol. 3 (2023)

Bibliography
 Debaixo das Rodas de um Automóvel (Editora Rocco, 2006; re-issued by Kotter Editorial in 2020)
 Lulismo Selvagem (Kotter Editorial, 2020)
 A Outra Volta da Outra Volta: Um Estudo Sobre Henry James (Kotter Editorial, 2022)

Filmography

Film

Television

References

External links
 
 

1956 births
Living people
Brazilian rock singers
Brazilian rock musicians
Brazilian classical guitarists
Brazilian male guitarists
Brazilian record producers
Musicians from Rio de Janeiro (city)
Brazilian male poets
Sonneteers
Brazilian essayists
21st-century essayists
Bossa nova singers
Música Popular Brasileira singers
Brazilian television presenters
Brazilian experimental musicians
Electronica musicians
Federal University of Rio de Janeiro alumni
Brazilian people of Italian descent
Brazilian people of Portuguese descent
Brazilian agnostics
Brazilian male film actors
21st-century Brazilian male actors
20th-century Brazilian male singers
20th-century Brazilian singers
21st-century Brazilian male singers
21st-century Brazilian singers
Obscenity controversies in music
Male jazz musicians
21st-century Brazilian male writers
21st-century Brazilian poets
Brazilian male singer-songwriters